Allan Tuer (born July 19, 1963) is a professional scout for the New York Rangers of the National Hockey League.  He was a professional ice hockey defenceman who was drafted by the Los Angeles Kings in the 9th round (186th overall) of the 1981 NHL Entry Draft.  

As a player he was known for his rough style of play.  He holds the Regina Pats single season record for penalty minutes, and the New Haven Nighthawks all-time penalty minute record. 

After retiring he has served as the general manager and head coach of the Moose Jaw Warriors, scout for the NHL Central Scouting Bureau, amateur scout for Calgary Flames, professional scout/director of pro scouting for Florida Panthers, and is currently a professional scout for the New York Rangers.

Career statistics

Regular season and playoffs

External links 
 

1963 births
Living people
Binghamton Whalers players
Calgary Flames scouts
Canadian ice hockey coaches
Canadian ice hockey defencemen
Cincinnati Cyclones (IHL) players
Cleveland Lumberjacks players
Florida Panthers scouts
Hartford Whalers players
Ice hockey people from Saskatchewan
Kalamazoo Wings (1974–2000) players
Los Angeles Kings draft picks
Los Angeles Kings players
Minnesota North Stars players
Moose Jaw Warriors coaches
New Haven Nighthawks players
Nova Scotia Oilers players
Regina Blues players
Regina Pats players
San Diego Gulls (IHL) players
Sportspeople from North Battleford
Tri-City Americans coaches